Koot is a Dutch surname. It originally may have been patronymic or toponymic or have referred the bird (coot, koet in modern Dutch). People with the name include:

Adick Koot (born 1963), Dutch football defender
Elly Koot (born 1943), Dutch model, Miss Europe 1964
Hendrik Koot (1898–1941), Dutch collaborator in World War II
Heer Koot, character name of Kees van Kooten (born 1941), Dutch comedian and writer
Marc Koot (born 1990), Dutch football striker
Simone Koot (born 1980), Dutch water polo player
Ton Koot (1907–1986), Dutch museum curator and non-fiction writer

See also
Aniek van Koot (born 1990), Dutch wheelchair tennis player
Koot (disambiguation)

References

Dutch-language surnames